Cecelia Carolina Bell (born December 26, 1970) is an American freelance author and illustrator born in Richmond, Virginia. She attended the Paier College of Art as an art major and went on to get a graduate degree in illustration and design at Kent State University in 1991. She became a freelance commercial artist, illustrator and designer for an array of projects before beginning her career as a full-time author illustrator, Her work has appeared in The Atlantic Monthly, Vegetarian Times, Newsweek, Los Angeles Times, Working Woman, Esquire and many other publications. Bell is married to children's author Tom Angleberger. She won the Newbery Medal Honor and Eisner Award for her book El Deafo.

El Deafo
El Deafo is based on Cece Bell's own childhood as she grows up deaf. She wanted there to be a handbook for hearing people so they knew how to understand and communicate with deaf people without being disrespectful. It eventually evolved into graphic novel where children who were deaf could see themselves positively represented in a book. Cece uses the imagery of everyone illustrated as rabbits as a visual metaphor. When she was growing up, she felt like the only rabbit whose ears didn't work as in doing so she shows being deaf as a power. She also shows and talks about how being deaf isn't something negative. The title comes from the idea that she feels powerful like a superhero with the assistance of her Phonic Ear, the hearing aid she uses in order to hear her teachers at school.

Bibliography
 El Deafo
 Sock Monkey Takes a Bath
 I Yam a Donkey
 Sock Monkey in the Spotlight
 Food Friends: Fun Foods That Go Together
 Sock Monkey Boogie Woogie: A Friend Is Made
 Sock Monkey Rides Again
 Sock Monkey Goes to Hollywood: A Star is Bathed
 Itty Bitty
 Bee-Wigged
 Rabbit and Robot: The Sleepover

References

External links

 
 

1970 births
American children's writers
Newbery Honor winners
Writers from Richmond, Virginia
American deaf people
Deaf writers
Deaf artists
Living people